The 1891 Illinois Fighting Illini football team was an American football team that represented the University of Illinois during the 1891 college football season. It was the second football team in the program's history. Coached by Robert Lackey, the team compiled a 5–1 record. Fullback Ralph W. Hart was the team captain.

Schedule

Roster

 Arms, Frank D. HB 
 Armstrong, James W. LT 
 Atherton, Geo H.	 LE 
 Barker, John K. RG 
 Bush, Arthur W. QB 
 Cook, James W. QB 
 Doxey, Samuel C 
 Gates, Andrew W. LG 
 Hart, Ralph W. FB  (capt)
 King, Harless W. RE 
 Needham, James LT 
 Parker, Walter A. RT 
 Slater, William F. LHB 
 Steele, James LG 
 Williams, Scott FB/E 
 Wright, Royal RHB 

Source: University of Illinois

References

Illinois
Illinois Fighting Illini football seasons
Illinois Fighting Illini football